Phillip Wilson (born 13 November 1996) is a New Zealand rower. He won Olympic gold in the men's eight event at the 2020 Summer Olympics. He went to Wellington College in Wellington where he took up rowing.

In March 2021, Rowing New Zealand announced the elite team for the Olympic year and Wilson was placed in the eight that had yet to qualify for the Games. At the Final Olympic Qualification Regatta at the Rotsee in May 2021, the top two teams gained qualification (four teams competed) and the New Zealand eight won both the preliminary race and the final. When New Zealand's Olympic team was announced in June 2021, Wilson was confirmed to start with the eight. At the Tokyo Olympics, the men's eight was beaten in their heat by the Netherlands and had to thus go to the repechage, which they won. In the final, they sprinted past Germany and Great Britain to win the gold medal.

References

External links
 

1996 births
Living people
New Zealand male rowers
Olympic rowers of New Zealand
Rowers at the 2020 Summer Olympics
Rowers from Wellington City
Olympic gold medalists for New Zealand in rowing
Medalists at the 2020 Summer Olympics
People educated at Wellington College (New Zealand)